Defending champion Sergi Bruguera defeated Alberto Berasategui in the final, 6–3, 7–5, 2–6, 6–1 to win the men's singles tennis title at the 1994 French Open. It was the first all-Spanish men's singles final at the French Open.

Pete Sampras was attempting to complete a non-calendar-year Grand Slam and to become the first man since Rod Laver in 1969 to hold all four major titles at once, having won the preceding Wimbledon, U.S. Open, and Australian Open titles. However, he lost to Jim Courier in the quarterfinals.

Seeds

Qualifying

Draw

Finals

Top half

Section 1

Section 2

Section 3

Section 4

Bottom half

Section 5

Section 6

Section 7

Section 8

External links
 Association of Tennis Professionals (ATP) – 1994 French Open Men's Singles draw
1994 French Open – Men's draws and results at the International Tennis Federation

Men's Singles
French Open by year – Men's singles
1994 ATP Tour